Jaime de la Pava Márquez (born 14 April 1967) is a Colombian football manager.

Career
Born in Barranquilla, de la Pava began coaching football with the youth side of Deportivo Cali. De la Pava won three consecutive league titles, all of them with América de Cali in 2000, 2001, and 2002. He also won a Copa Merconorte in 1999 and a Copa Colombia with Deportivo Cali in 2010.

References

External links

1967 births
Living people
Colombian football managers
América de Cali managers
Independiente Santa Fe managers
Deportivo Cali managers
Once Caldas managers
F.C. Motagua managers
Cúcuta Deportivo managers
Deportivo Táchira F.C. managers
C.D. FAS managers
Cortuluá managers
Deportes Tolima managers
Asociación Civil Deportivo Lara managers
C.S.D. Macará managers
Atlético Venezuela C.F. managers